Dziubiele Małe  is a settlement in the administrative district of Gmina Orzysz, within Pisz County, Warmian-Masurian Voivodeship, in northern Poland.

References

Villages in Pisz County